Crombie's wall gecko (Tarentola crombiei), also known commonly as the Oriente tuberculate gecko, is a species of lizard in the family Phyllodactylidae. The species is endemic to Cuba.

Etymology
The specific name, crombiei, is in honor of American herpetologist Ronald Ian Crombie.

Geographic range
T. crombiei is found along the southeastern coast of Cuba in Granma Province, Guantánamo Province, and Santiago de Cuba Province.

Habitat
The preferred natural habitat of T. crombiei is dry forest.

Description

Diet
T. crombiei preys upon insects.

Reproduction
T. crombiei is oviparous. Clutch size is only one egg, which is fusiform and nonadhesive.

References

Further reading
Díaz LM, Hedges SB (2008). "A new gecko of the genus Tarentola (Squamata: Gekkonidae) from Eastern Cuba". Zootaxa 1743: 53–61. (Tarentola crombiei, new species).

Tarentola
Reptiles described in 2008
Endemic fauna of Cuba